Rupf is a surname. Notable people with the surname include:

Daniel Rupf (footballer, born 1967), Swiss footballer
Daniel Rupf (footballer, born 1986), German footballer
Eugen Rupf (1914–2000), Swiss footballer
Konrad Rupf (1929–2013), German bass-baritone and teacher

See also
Ruff (surname)